The Rebel (French: Le rebelle) is a 1931 French drama film directed by Adelqui Migliar and starring Suzy Vernon, Thomy Bourdelle and Paule Andral. The film is based on the 1928 play The General (Hungarian:A tábornok) by Lajos Zilahy.

The film is the French-language version of The Virtuous Sin (1930).

Cast
 Suzy Vernon - Maria Ivanovna 
 Thomy Bourdelle - General Platoff 
 Paule Andral - Alexandra 
 Pierre Batcheff - Lt. Boris Sabline 
 Henry Prestat - Un jeune Général 
 Frédéric Mariotti - L'ordonnance 
 André Rehan - Spoliansky 
 Jeanne Brazine - La Chanreuse 
 Georges La Cressonnière - Le lieutenant Glinka

References

Bibliography
 Powrie, Phil & Rebillard, Éric. Pierre Batcheff and stardom in 1920s French cinema. Edinburgh University Press, 2009

External links

1931 films
French drama films
1930s French-language films
Films directed by Adelqui Migliar
French films based on plays
French black-and-white films
French multilingual films
Films set in Russia
Films set in the 1910s
1931 drama films
1931 multilingual films
1930s French films